Henry Steiner (born 13 February 1934) is an Austrian graphic designer, best known for his corporate identity designs. He has created designs for some of the most identifiable brands, such as IBM, Hyatt Regency, Hilton Hotels, Dow Jones, HSBC, Standard Chartered, Unilever, and was commissioned to design the city's bank notes by the Hong Kong government in 1975. Steiner was educated at the Sorbonne and at Yale. In 1964, he founded his own consultancy firm, Steiner&Co, in Hong Kong.

Hailed as the "Father of Hong Kong graphical design", Henry Steiner pioneered the expression of identity through branding, particularly in Asia where his skill for incorporating Eastern cultural symbols into Western design has garnered international acclaim
. Steiner was included in Icograda’s list of the Masters of the 20th Century in 2002, and was named a World Master by Idea magazine.

Biography
Steiner was born into an Austrian Jewish family as Hans Steiner. His parents, a dentist practising in Baden bei Wien and a seamstress, enjoyed "a nice bourgeois life" until the Anschluss in 1938, after which the family decided to flee the country. After many failures, his mother turned to help from a Hollywood film producer, Julius Stoeger, who agreed to assist in their escape as he mistook a young Steiner as Chinese. When the family arrived in New York City in 1939, an immigration officer changed the boy's name to Henry, since Hans sounded "too German". The Steiners lived a hard life there and the couple divorced in 1940s.

Henry Steiner was admitted to Stuyvesant High School and then Hunter College, where he decided to turn his deep interest in scientific fiction into a graphic design career. He enrolled for a Master's degree in graphic design at Yale University to study with Paul Rand and won a Fulbright Fellowship to further his studies at Sorbonne in Paris, France. He then returned to New York City and worked as design director for The Asia Magazine, which was a pioneer as colour-printed magazine.

In 1961, Steiner signed a nine-month contract for the magazine's launch in Hong Kong where he started Graphic Communication (now Steiner&Co.) in 1964. When Hong Kong saw an economic boom in 1960s to 70s, he settled in the Asian city and was inspired by its traditional aesthetics.

Selected designs

HSBC

The Hongkong and Shanghai Banking Corporation is a world recognized brand for banking, finance, brokerage, and insurance. In 1984, Henry Steiner developed a corporate identity for the bank based on St. Andrew's cross flag, alluded to the Scottish heritage of the bank's founder.

Hong Kong Bank Notes
Henry Steiner designed the Hong Kong banknote for the Standard Chartered Bank between 1975 and 2016. He noted that banknotes of the city have a rare practice of not featuring portraits, therefore he incorporated mythical Chinese creatures in his designs on the observe side – the notes appeared in five denominations and showcased a hierarchy of aquatic, amphibious, terrestrial and celestial creatures.  In 2003, Henry Steiner updated the designs incorporating the latest anti-counterfeiting technology, with the reverse featuring Hong Kong’s dynamic harbour from various time periods. In 2010s, he was commissioned for the last time to design banknotes which featured Chinese traditional and modern technology. He also designed an unprecedented 150-dollar commemorative banknote for the bank's 150th anniversary in 2009, which featured the Standard Chartered Bank Building and a group of people representing Hong Kong's history watching over the coasts of Victoria Harbour.

Recognition

Honours
President of Alliance Graphique Internationale
Fellow of the Chartered Society of Designers
Fellow of the Hong Kong Designers Association
Honorary member of Design Austria
Member of the American Institute of Graphic Arts
Member of the New York Art Directors Club
Awarded an honorary Doctorate by Hong Kong Baptist University
Awarded the Hong Kong Print Outstanding Achievement Award
Awarded the Asia-Europe Foundation Logo Award
Awarded the Golden Decoration of Honour of the Republic of Austria for design achievement and service to the Austrian community
Honorary professor at the University of Hong Kong's School of Architecture
Honorary professor at the Hong Kong Polytechnic University’s School of Design
Named Hong Kong Designer of the Year (1990) by Hong Kong Artists' Guild 
Named a World Master by Japan’s Idea magazine
Listed a Masters of the 20th Century by Icograda
Cited as one of the 100 most important people affecting Hong Kong's development since 1841 by Next Magazine

Awards
Outstanding Entries, Fourth Asian Advertising Congress, Hong Kong (1964)
Award of Excellence, Typomundus 20 (1966)
Excellence, The Mead Library of Ideas, Annual Report Shows, USA (1969 to 1985)
Creative Awards, Asian Advertising Congress (1968 to 1974)
Governor's Award for Hong Kong Design (1970)
First Prize, Seventh Asian Advertising Congress, New Delhi (1970)
Bronze Medal, Biennale des Arts Graphique, Brno, Czechoslovakia (1972)
Award, International Poster Biennale, Warsaw (1972, 1976)
Outstanding Packaging Award, Hong Kong Packaging Council (1973)
First Prize, Festival of Hong Kong Stamp Exhibition (1973)
Asiastar Packaging Award, The Asian Packaging Federation (1974)
First Prize, Financial Advertising, The Times, London (1974)
Award of Excellence, Communication Arts, USA (1974 to 1992)
Gold, Bronze, Silver Awards, Hongkong Designers Association (1975 to 1999)
Design Excellence, Print Casebooks (1975 to 1978)
The One Show Merit Award, The Art Directors Club, New York (1976)
Merit Award, Hong Kong Packaging Council (1976)
Merit Awards, The New York Art Directors Club (1976, 1990)
Awards, Asian Graphic Design Biennale, Tehran (1978)
Awards of Excellence, Society of Typographic Arts USA (1978 to 1980)
Typographic Excellence, Type Directors Club, New York (1979 to 1988)
Silver Award, Association of Accredited Advertising Agents, Hong Kong (1983, 1984)
Bronze Medal, Book Art Biennale, Brno, Czechoslovakia (1984)
Gold Award, TTF Paper Creative Award, Hong Kong (1988)
Excellence, The Best of International Self-Promotion, Australia (1989)
Designer of the Year, Hong Kong Artists' Guild (1990)
Silver Award, Annual Report, Hong Kong Print Awards (1990)
Sponsor's Award, The 33rd All-Japan Poster Exhibition (1991)
Awards of Excellence, The Best of International Self-Promotion, USA (1993)
'Best in Business Publication' Award, Chartered Society of Hong Kong (1995)
Premier Award, std International TypoGraphic Awards, England (1998)
Gold Award, Hong Kong Designers Associations (2000)
Golden Decoration of Honour of the Republic of Austria (2006)

Bibliography

References

External links
 Henry Steiner: “A very ‘weanerisch’ Sensibility”

Austrian graphic designers
Logo designers
Living people
University of Paris alumni
Yale University alumni
1934 births